John Bartram (March 23, 1699 – September 22, 1777) was an American botanist, horticulturist, and explorer, based in Philadelphia, Pennsylvania, for most of his career. Swedish botanist and taxonomist Carl Linnaeus said he was the "greatest natural botanist in the world." Bartram corresponded with and shared North American plants and seeds with a variety of scientists in England and Europe. 

He started what is known as Bartram's Garden in 1728 at his farm in Kingsessing (now part of Philadelphia). It was considered the first botanic garden in the United States. His sons and descendants operated it until 1850. Still operating in a partnership between the city of Philadelphia and a non-profit foundation, it was designated a National Historic Landmark in 1960.

Early life
Bartram was born into a Quaker farm family in colonial Darby, Pennsylvania near Philadelphia, on March 23, 1699. He considered himself a plain farmer, with no formal education beyond the local school. He had a lifelong interest in medicine and medicinal plants, and read widely. He started his botanical career by devoting a small area of his farm to growing plants he found interesting. Later, he made contact with European botanists and gardeners interested in North American plants, and developed his hobby into a thriving business.

Plant collecting activities
Bartram began to travel extensively in the eastern American colonies in order to study and collect plants. In 1743, he visited western parts of New York and the northern shores of Lake Ontario, and wrote Observations on the Inhabitants, Climate, Soil, Rivers, Productions, Animals, and other Matters Worthy of Notice, made by Mr. John Bartram in his Travels from Pennsylvania to Onondaga, Oswego, and the Lake Ontario, in Canada (London, 1751). During the winter of 1765/66, he visited East Florida in the south, which was a British colony, and published an account of this trip with his journal (London, 1766). He also visited areas along the Ohio River west of the Appalachian Mountains. Many of his plant acquisitions were shipped to collectors in Europe. In return, they supplied him with books and apparatus.

Bartram, sometimes called the "father of American botany", was one of the first practicing Linnaean botanists in North America. He forwarded plant specimens to Carl Linnaeus, Dillenius, and Gronovius. He also assisted Linnaeus's student Pehr Kalm during his extended collecting trip to North America in 1748–1750.

Bartram was aided in his collecting efforts by other British colonists. In Bartram's Diary of a Journey through the Carolinas, Georgia and Florida, a trip taken from July 1, 1765, to April 10, 1766, Bartram wrote of specimens he had collected. In the colony of British East Florida, he was helped by Dr. David Yeats, secretary of the colony.

About 1728 he established an  botanic garden in Kingsessing, on the west bank of the Schuylkill, about 3 miles (5 km) from the center of Philadelphia, Pennsylvania. Known as Bartram's Garden, it is frequently cited as the first true botanic collection in North America. It was designated in 1960 as a National Historic Landmark. 

In 1743 Bartram was one of the co-founders, along with Benjamin Franklin, of the American Philosophical Society in Philadelphia. It supported scientific studies as well as philosophy.

Contact with other botanists

Bartram was particularly instrumental in sending seeds from the New World to European gardeners; many North American trees and flowers were first introduced into cultivation in Europe by this route. Beginning around 1733, Bartram's work was assisted by his association with the English merchant Peter Collinson. Collinson, also a lover of plants, was a fellow Quaker and a member of the Royal Society, with a familiar relationship with its president, Sir Hans Sloane.  Collinson shared Bartram's new plants with friends and fellow gardeners. Early Bartram collections went to Lord Petre, Philip Miller at the Chelsea Physic Garden, Mark Catesby, the Duke of Richmond, and the Duke of Norfolk. In the 1730s, Robert James Petre, 8th Baron Petre of Thorndon Hall, Essex, was the foremost collector in Europe of North American trees and shrubs. Earl Petre's death in 1743 resulted in his American tree collection being auctioned off to Woburn, Goodwood, and other large English country estates. Thereafter, Collinson became Bartram's chief London agent.

"Bartram's Boxes", as they became known, were shipped regularly to Peter Collinson every fall for distribution in England to a wide list of clients, including the Duke of Argyll, James Gordon,  James Lee, and John Busch, progenitor of the exotic Loddiges nursery in London. The boxes generally contained 100 or more varieties of seeds, and sometimes included dried plant specimens and natural history curiosities, as well. Live plants were more difficult and expensive to send and were reserved for Collinson and a few special correspondents.

In 1765, after lobbying by Collinson and Benjamin Franklin in London, George III rewarded Bartram a pension of £50 per year as King's Botanist for North America, a post he held until his death. With this position, Bartram shipped his seeds and plants also to the royal collection at Kew Gardens. Bartram also contributed seeds to the Oxford and Edinburgh botanic gardens. In 1769 he was elected a foreign member of the Royal Swedish Academy of Sciences in Stockholm.

Bartram died on September 22, 1777. He was buried at the Darby Friends Cemetery in Darby, Pennsylvania.

Legacy and honors
Most of Bartram's many plant discoveries were named by botanists in Europe. He is best known today for the discovery and introduction of a wide range of North American flowering trees and shrubs, including kalmia, rhododendron, and magnolia species; for introducing the Dionaea muscipulia or Venus flytrap to cultivation; and for discovering the Franklin tree, Franklinia alatamaha in southeastern Georgia in 1765, later named by his son William Bartram. 

The genera of mosses, Bartramia, was named for him, as were such plants as the North American serviceberry, Amelanchier bartramiana, as well as the subtropical tree Commersonia bartramia (brown kurrajong). This grows in an area from the Bellinger River in coastal eastern Australia to Cape York, Vanuatu, and Malaysia.

John Bartram High School in Philadelphia is named after him.

Bartram's Garden has been designated as a National Historic Landmark.

Family
Bartram married twice, first in 1723 to Mary Maris (d. 1727), who bore him two sons, Richard and Isaac. After her death, in 1729 he married Ann Mendenhall (1703–1789). They had five boys and four girls together. 

His third son, William Bartram (1739–1823), became a noted botanist, natural history artist, and ornithologist in his own right. He wrote Travels Through North & South Carolina, Georgia, East & West Florida,… which was published in Philadelphia by James & Johnson in 1791.

The family business in North American plants was continued after the American Revolution by Bartram's sons John Bartram, Jr., and William Bartram. A total of three generations of the Bartram family continued to operate and expand the botanic garden. Bartram's Garden was known as the major botanic garden in Philadelphia until the last Bartram heirs sold out in 1850.

See also
 List of gardener-botanist explorers of the Enlightenment
 Darby Meeting
 Darby Free Library
 Franklinia
 Humphry Marshall
 Thomas Say

References

Further reading
 Berkeley, Edmund and Dorothy Smith Berkeley, The Life and Travels of John Bartram: From Lake Ontario to the River St. John. (Tallahassee: University Presses of Florida, 1982).
 Berkeley, Edmund and Dorothy Smith Berkeley, eds., The Correspondence of John Bartram 1734–1777. (Gainesville: University Press of Florida, 1992).
 
 Darlington, William, ed., Memorials of John Bartram and Humphry Marshall. (Philadelphia: Lindsay & Blakiston, 1849).
 
 
 Isely, Duane, One hundred and one botanists (Iowa State University Press, 1994), pp. 80–81.
 O'Neill, Jean and Elizabeth P. McLean, Peter Collinson and the Eighteenth-Century Natural History Exchange. Memoirs of the American Philosophical Society, vol. 264. (Philadelphia: APS, 2008).
 Wulf, Andrea, The Brother Gardeners: Botany, Empire and the Birth of an Obsession. (London: William Heinemann, 2008).

External links
 The Memorable Bartrams.
  John Bartram's house and garden.
  John Bartram biographical information
  Small biography of Bartram
 The Bartram Family Papers, including correspondence, journey observations, illustrations and his pharmacopoeia, are available for research use at the Historical Society of Pennsylvania.

1699 births
1777 deaths
People from Darby, Pennsylvania
American Quakers
American botanists
Botanists active in North America
17th-century Quakers
18th-century Quakers
Members of the Royal Swedish Academy of Sciences
American horticulturists
Members of the American Philosophical Society
People of colonial Pennsylvania
People from Delaware County, Pennsylvania